The Sunnyside Country Club is a private country club with a championship golf course. It is located in the Sunnyside neighborhood in Fresno County, at Fresno, California, a historic community southeast of the city limits of Fresno. Designed by golf course architect William P. Bell and opening in 1911, it is the oldest golf course in Fresno and one of the oldest in California.  In addition to the golf course, Sunnsyside Country Club has a swimming pool, tennis courts, exercise facilities and a restaurant and bar for its members.

History 

Sunnyside County Club traces its origins back to one of the early vineyards of Fresno County.  In 1890, the land on which the club currently sits was purchased by William N. Oothout from Frederick Roeding, creating the Sunnyside Vineyard.  By 1911, a group of wealthy and well-known Fresnans, including George C. Roeding, C.C. Teague and Frank Romain, bought a portion of the old Sunnyside Vineyard and Oothout’s colonial home to build a golf course for the club. The men hired Bell to design the golf course, which was completed in 1911. Oothout's colonial home was used at the clubhouse, until it was destroyed by fire in 1941.

The existing clubhouse is built in the mid-century modern style an contains a large fireplace sculpture by Fresno artist Stan Bitters.  The clubhouse was built in 1948 and was designed by H. Rafael Lake.

The Fresno Open on the LPGA Tour was held at Sunnyside in 1951 and 1952, with Babe Zaharias winning both tournaments.  Sunnyside currently hosts numerous NCAA and amateur tournaments.

Throughout its history, many well-known Fresnans have lived on the course itself, including Fresno State Bulldogs Football Coach Jim Sweeney (hole 7) and World War II Flying Ace Pappy Boyington (hole 14).

Scorecard

References

External links 

Golf clubs and courses in California
Golf clubs and courses designed by William P. Bell